Burgundian can refer to any of the following:

Someone or something from Burgundy.
Burgundians, an East Germanic tribe, who first appear in history in South East Europe. Later Burgundians colonised the area of Gaul that is now known as Burgundy (French Bourgogne)
The Old Burgundian language (Germanic), an East Germanic language spoken by the Burgundians
The Modern Burgundian language (Oïl), an Oïl language also known as  spoken in the region of Burgundy, France. 
 Frainc-Comtou dialect, sometimes regarded as part of the Burgundian group of languages
Burgundian (party), a political faction in early 15th century during the Hundred Years' War

See also
 Burgundian War (disambiguation)

Language and nationality disambiguation pages